Bridgetena "Brettena" Smyth (née Riordan; 1845 – 15 February 1898) was an Australian women's rights activist. She was also an entrepreneur, converting the family store into a drapery business and drug store after her husband's death.

Biography
The daughter of John Riordan and Bridgetena Cavanagh, she was born in Kyneton. She was largely self-taught but an avid reader. In 1861, she married William Taylor Smyth, a greengrocer; the couple had five children. After he died in 1873, she converted the family store into a drapery business and drug store.

Following her husband's death, she became an active member of the Victorian Women's Suffrage Society. In 1888, she formed the Australian Women's Suffrage Society. An advocate of birth control, she lectured on contraceptive techniques and sold a women's contraceptive device, a rubber pessary from France, in her shop. She advocated a more balanced partnership between men and women in marriage.

She planned to study medicine at the University of Melbourne but was thwarted by the financial crisis during the 1890s.

Smyth died of Bright's disease at the residence of her son, Charles Smyth, Cricketers' Hotel, Morwell. "Fortified by rites of Holy Church", she was buried in Melbourne General Cemetery.

Publications
 Love, Courtship and Marriage (1892)
 The Limitation of Offspring (1893)
 The Social Evil (1894)
 What Every Woman Should Know: Diseases Incidental to Women (1895)

References

Further reading
 "Brettana Smyth (1840–1898)" in 
 "Feminism and the Family: Brettena Smyth" by Farley Kelly in 
 "Brettena Smyth: Sex and Politics" by Kathryn Sutherland in 

1845 births
1898 deaths
Australian suffragists
People from Kyneton
19th-century Australian writers
19th-century Australian women writers
Deaths from kidney disease
Australian women in business
Burials at Melbourne General Cemetery